An April March was a Canadian alternative rock band formed in Kitchener, Ontario, in 1989. The band's last incarnation consisted of singer/guitarist Danella Hocevar, guitarist Chris Perry and drummer Michael Klüg. The band "An April March" is not to be confused with April March, or Russian and French bands called by similar names.

History
The band members met in 1989 in Kitchener, Ontario, called themselves The Whittingtons and self-released a demo cassette. After Hocevar and Perry moved to Toronto, the band changed its name to An April March and began recording and performing in Toronto at venues such as the Horseshoe Tavern. Their stylistic influences include dream pop, shoegazing, ethereal and ambient. The earliest lineup under the new name was Hocevar and Perry, with Bob Lembke on bass and Joel Walsh on drums. Some recordings and performances also included Ian Ring (later of The Dervishes) on saxophone, who played with the band for about a year.

An April March independently produced two EPs: Memory Gardens (1990), and Scarlett Bliss (1991). Also in 1991, they contributed the song, "Jade", to the A Giant Leap Of Faith Volume Two compilation album released on vinyl and produced by University of Waterloo's CKMS-FM station manager Bill Wharrie.

In 1993, the band signed with the Washington, DC-based label Bedazzled Records and released their first full-length album,  Impatiens. That was followed by the EP Instruments of Lust and Fury (1995), the album Lessons in Vengeance (1995), and the EP Adagio (1996). They released their last album, It Goes Without Saying, in 1997. A final EP, Something Once True Is Always True..., was released in 1999.

The group broke up in 1999, playing their last show on 29 April of that year.

An April March songs appeared on numerous compilation albums and they recorded songs for tribute albums to the Cocteau Twins and The Pixies. They released two videos: "Lava" and "Scarlet Bliss".

After splitting up in 1999, the band members pursued solo careers, with Hocevar releasing music under the moniker 'Danellatron'. Lambke and Klüg continued to record; Chris Perry became a record producer.

Discography 

Albums
 Impatiens (1993), Cartwheel Productions
 Lessons in Vengeance (1995), Bedazzled Records
 It Goes Without Saying (1997), Bedazzled Records

EPs
 Memory Gardens (1990), Independent
 Scarlett Bliss (1991), Independent
 Instruments of Lust and Fury (1995), Bedazzled Records
 Adagio (1996), Bedazzled Records
 Something Once True Is Always True... (1999), Bedazzled Records

Singles
 "The Last of Ariadne" / "No Answer" (1992), Apostrophe Records/Cartwheel Productions, 1992 (split 7-inch with the Curtain Society
 "Lava" / "Gates Within Us" (1994), Bedazzled Records

Compilation Inclusions
 A Giant Leap Of Faith Volume Two (1991), Sleet Records. Song: "Jade" 
 Anon (1993), Castle von Buhler. Song "Ceiling"
 Woke Up Smiling (1995), Bedazzled Records. Song: "Delirium"
 Radio Hepcats (1996), Antarctic Press.Song: "The Red Dots"
 Alleviation (1996), Silber Records. Song: "Avidbake"
 Xmas 97 (1997), Bedazzled Records. Songs: "Scarlet Bliss", "Lava", and "Waltz of the Flowers", vs. Pi Tchaikovsky
 Losing Today Volume I (1998), Losing Today Records. Song: "Let Everyone Down"
 News From Nowhere (1998), Plan 11 Records. Song: "Daylight Falters"
 Pixies Fuckin' Die! (A Tribute) (1999), Lifelike Records, The Orchard. Song: "Alex Eiffel"
 Half-Gifts: A Tribute To The Cocteau Twins (2002), Dewdrops Records. Song: "Pink Orange Red"

See also
 Shoegazing
 List of shoegazing musicians
 Dream pop
 Alternative rock

References

External links 
 myspace.com/danellahocevar
 myspace.com/datafreqvsdanellatron
 chrisperry.ca
 An April March discography
 [ An April March credits], AllMusic Guide
 [ Danella Hocevar credits], ''AllMusic Guide'

Canadian shoegaze musical groups
Canadian alternative rock groups
Canadian indie rock groups
Musical groups established in 1989
Musical groups disestablished in 1999
Musical groups from Kitchener, Ontario
Ethereal wave musical groups
Canadian goth groups
1989 establishments in Ontario
1999 disestablishments in Ontario